The Boston University College of Health and Rehabilitation Sciences: Sargent College (SAR) is a unit of Boston University. The College offers both undergraduate and graduate degree programs to prepare students for both research and clinical careers in health care and the rehabilitation sciences.

History 
In 1881, Dr. Dudley Allen Sargent founded the Sargent School of Physical Training in Cambridge, Massachusetts. During the decades that followed the establishment of the School, Sargent built a reputation as an innovator in physical conditioning and health promotion. At the Sargent School, students learned training techniques to strengthen and improve the physical capabilities of all people, including both disabled and healthy individuals. This emphasis on comprehensive health care remains a focus of the College today. Sargent College became part of Boston University in 1929, five years after Sargent's death.

In the fall of 1990, BU Sargent College moved to an extensively renovated facility at 635 Commonwealth Avenue. The six-story building contains classrooms, student lounges, research laboratories, an outpatient clinic, and faculty and staff offices.

Areas of study 
The Sargent College has four academic departments that confer degrees upon undergraduate and graduate students:
Department of Health Sciences
Department of Occupational Therapy
Department of Physical Therapy & Athletic Training
Department of Speech, Language & Hearing Sciences

Undergraduate 
SAR offers the following degrees at the undergraduate level:
Bachelor of Science (BS)
Behavior & Health
Health Science
Nutritional Science
Physical Therapy
Speech, Language & Hearing Sciences
Dietetics
Human Physiology

Graduate
SAR offers the following degrees in the graduate program:
 Master of Science (MS)
 Athletic Training
 Human Physiology
 Nutrition
 Nutrition-Dietetic Internship
 Speech-Language Pathology
 Doctor of Occupational Therapy (OTD)
 Entry-Level
 Post-Professional
 Doctor of Philosophy (PhD)
 Human Physiology
 Speech, Language & Hearing Sciences
 Rehabilitation Sciences
 Doctor of Physical Therapy (DPT)

Center for Psychiatric Rehabilitation 
BU Sargent College houses the Center for Psychiatric Rehabilitation, the first nationally funded psychiatric rehabilitation center in the United States.
 it was designated as the World Health Organization Collaborating Center in Psychiatric Rehabilitation.

U.S. News Best Graduate Schools 

Over the years, U.S. News & World Reports Best Graduate School rankings have consistently found the graduate programs at BU Sargent College to be among the best in the country.  Sargent College graduate programs ranked as follows: occupational therapy program was ranked number 1 (out of 198 programs), physical therapy was ranked number 20 (out of 239 programs), and speech-language pathology was ranked number 10 (out of 261 programs).

References

External links 
 Boston University College of Health and Rehabilitation Sciences: Sargent College
 The Center for Enhancing Activity and Participation among Persons with Arthritis
 Aphasia Resource Center
 Center for Neurorehabilitation
 Physical Therapy Center
 Center for Psychiatric Rehabilitation
 Ryan Center for Sports Medicine & Rehabilitation
 Sargent Choice Nutrition Center

Boston University
Educational institutions established in 1881
Health sciences schools in the United States
1881 establishments in Massachusetts